The Bastrop Daily Enterprise was an American daily newspaper published in Bastrop, Louisiana. It was owned by Gannett. The newspaper closed on March 29, 2019 citing "shrinking advertising markets locally and nationally." The final issue was published on March 29, 2019. 

The paper covered the city of Bastrop and Morehouse Parish.

References

Newspapers published in Louisiana
Morehouse Parish, Louisiana
Gannett publications
Publications established in 1904
Publications disestablished in 2019
1904 establishments in Louisiana
2019 disestablishments in Louisiana